Baseodiscus is a genus of nemerteans belonging to the family Valenciniidae.

The genus has cosmopolitan distribution.

Species
Species:

Baseodiscus abyssorum 
Baseodiscus alpha 
Baseodiscus anocellatus 
Baseodiscus antarcticus 
Baseodiscus antillensis 
Baseodiscus aureus 
Baseodiscus australis 
Baseodiscus bilineatus 
Baseodiscus cingulatus 
Baseodiscus delineatus 
Baseodiscus discolor 
Baseodiscus edmondsoni 
Baseodiscus filholi 
Baseodiscus giardii 
Baseodiscus hemprichii 
Baseodiscus indicus 
Baseodiscus jonasii 
Baseodiscus longissimus 
Baseodiscus lumbricoides 
Baseodiscus maculosus 
Baseodiscus mexicanus 
Baseodiscus minor 
Baseodiscus multiporatus 
Baseodiscus nipponensis 
Baseodiscus pallidus 
Baseodiscus pellucidus 
Baseodiscus pholidotus 
Baseodiscus platei 
Baseodiscus princeps 
Baseodiscus punnetti 
Baseodiscus quinquelineatus 
Baseodiscus rugosus 
Baseodiscus sordidus 
Baseodiscus sulcatus 
Baseodiscus takakurai 
Baseodiscus unicolor 
Baseodiscus unistriatus 
Baseodiscus univittatus

References

Heteronemertea
Nemertea genera